Ashley Buccille (born January 30, 1986) is an American film and television actress. She is best known for her roles in the films Phenomenon (1996) and Tumbleweeds (1999). From 1997 to 2003, she provided the voice of Lila Sawyer on the Nickelodeon animated series Hey Arnold!.

Filmography

Films

Television series

Awards

References

External links
 

1986 births
American child actresses
American film actresses
American television actresses
American voice actresses
Living people
Place of birth missing (living people)
21st-century American women